(WNL) is a Japanese 24-hour live streaming channel owned and operated by  (WNI), the largest privately owned weather company in the world. WNL started broadcasting 16 April 2018, replacing SOLiVE 24, a similar streaming service also operated by WNI since 27 April 2009.

Programming
Weathernews LiVE broadcasts six live programmes of three hours each from 05:00 to 23:00 JST every day; the programmes are routinely divided into 30-minute blocks (around 25 minutes of content and intervals of approximately 5 minutes). The remaining hours are filled with updated weather information and no on-air talent; in case of an emergency, special programming is broadcast and, if necessary, a meteorologist and/or a presenter will provide updates. The channel is focused on weather and meteorological information for Japan, including typhoons, volcanic activity and earthquakes.

Most of the content is provided by meteorology professionals at parent company WNI, with weather reports sent by users of the company's mobile app featured during the programming, including guides on how to use some of its features and how to send a report. Some segments, depending on the hour of the day, include the anniversaries of the day, the Japanese seasonal days, weather or Japanese culture-related quizzes, or simply ad lib by the presenters known as casters, who routinely interact with the audience through YouTube or Niconico's chat feature.

WNL broadcasts live on the internet through YouTube, Niconico, Twitch, Twitter, Facebook, TikTok, and LINE Live. As of April 2022, some programmes are simulcast on satellite channel BS Fuji (the first half hour of Weathernews LiVE Morning) and a digital subchannel of Mie Prefecture's local station MTV (some programmes on weekdays' daytime on channel 072).

WNL is home to Weatheroid Type A Airi (nicknamed Ponko), a character based on presenter Airi Yamagishi, who also dubs her voice during her weekly programme on Thursday nights, broadcast since 2014 during the SOLiVE24 era and as of August 2022 preempting the last hour of Weathernews LiVE Moon. The character was introduced in April 2012.

On late February 2021, a video where presenter Saya Hiyama switches from light-hearted banter to an earthquake early warning in a few seconds became a viral phenomenon on internet and gave WNL some notoriety overseas. The clip, shared by one of dozens of WNL fan channels on YouTube, has more than 28 million views as of April 2022. Another clip of Hiyama posted 12 November 2021 has earned more than 13 million views on YouTube in part because it was featured on the Daily Mail website.

Programmes
As of August 2022:
 Weathernews LiVE Morning: 05:00 to 08:00 JST
 Weathernews LiVE Sunshine: 08:00 to 11:00 JST
 Weathernews LiVE Coffee Time: 11:00 to 14:00 JST
 Weathernews LiVE Afternoon: 14:00 to 17:00 JST
 Weathernews LiVE Evening: 17:00 to 20:00 JST
 Weathernews LiVE Moon: 20:00 to 23:00 JST

Personnel

Presenters (casters)
As of August 2022:
 Airi Yamagishi (debuted 28 April 2009 at SOLiVE Morning)
 Sayane Egawa (debuted 24 December 2011 at SOLiVE Twilight)
 Ayaka Matsuyuki (debuted 7 April 2014 at SOLiVE Morning; on maternity leave since October 2021)
 Yukari Shirai (debuted 7 September 2015 at SOLiVE Morning)
 Nana Takayama (debuted 19 September 2015 at SOLiVE Coffee Time)
 Saya Hiyama (debuted 17 October 2018 at Weathernews Live 16:00-17:00 block)
 Yui Komaki (debuted 18 October 2018 at Weathernews Live 16:00-17:00 block)
 Yuki Uchida (debuted 6 April 2020 at Weathernews LiVE Coffee Time (11:00-12:30 block))
 Rinon Ohshima (debuted 2 December 2021 at Weathernews LiVE Afternoon)
 Mizuki Tokita (debuted 2 December 2021 at Weathernews LiVE Coffee Time (13:00-14:00 block))
 Akira Kawabata (on-air meteorologist filling as caster, debuted 20 April 2022 at Weathernews LiVE Afternoon)
 Riena Kobayashi (debuted 31 August 2022 at Weathernews LiVE Coffee Time (13:00-14:00 block))

On-air meteorologists
As of April 2022:
Takehisa Yamaguchi
Tatsuya Unozawa
Tatsuō Yoshino
Kunihiro Naitō
Akira Kawabata (filling as a presenter since 20 April 2022)
Kiyoteru Morita (also a former WNI executive as supervisor of the Forecasting Centre)
Tatsuya Honda
Masaru Kida

References

External links
 Weathernews Live
 Daily timetable
 Presenters and meteorologists list

Weather television networks
Japanese news websites
Meteorological data and networks
Television channels and stations established in 2018
2018 establishments in Japan
2018 in Japanese television